The Parker Playhouse is a 1,191-seat theatre in southern Florida.

The Playhouse was established by Dr. Louis Parker. The curtain rose for the first time on February 6, 1967 as E.G. Marshall and Dennis O'Keefe starred in Neil Simon’s The Odd Couple. Parker teamed with Broadway impresario Zev Buffman, who was also producing shows in Miami at the Coconut Grove Playhouse, to offer productions featuring many of the top theater artists of the day. Parker Playhouse has produced continuously for nearly 40 years..

Today, (2006) the Parker Playhouse is controlled by the Performing Arts Center Authority ("PACA") – the governing body that oversees the Broward Center for the Performing Arts which manages the theater and provides the programming on its stage.

References

External links

Theatres in Florida
Fort Lauderdale, Florida